Elvira Moragas Cantarero, religious name María Sagrario de San Luis Gonzaga, (8 January 1881 – 15 August 1936) was a Spanish nun of the Order of the Discalced Carmelites of the Blessed Virgin Mary of Mount Carmel. 

Her initial path was to follow her father in the pharmaceutical business and she excelled in this and having become one of the first women to become a pharmacist. This continued after the death of her father when she assumed control of the business and later stepped aside for her brother to take over when it became clear that she felt inclined to enter the religious life. Her time in the convent saw her assume leadership roles in which she was protective of her fellow nuns with an amiable disposition. But the outbreak of the Spanish Civil War forced her to flee into hiding alongside another nun while refusing her brother's invitation to live with him since she wanted to ensure her fellow religious were kept safe. But she herself was captured and later shot dead in the middle of the night when the militia grew furious with her silence during interrogations.

Her death caused for widespread calls for the beatification process to be introduced and which later opened in 1962 under Pope John XXIII; she became titled as a Servant of God once the cause commenced. Pope John Paul II beatified Moragas in mid-1998 in Saint Peter's Square.

Life
Elvira Moragas Cantarero was born in Lillo in Toledo in 1881 as the third of four children born to Ricardo Moragas and Isabel Cantarero. Her father worked as a pharmacist and took control of the business from his father Severiano Moragas. Her elder sister Sagrario (born in 1879) died in 1890.

The Moragas moved to Madrid in 1886 after King Alfonso XIII appointed her father as a pharmaceutical advisor to the monarch; the Moragas had been in El Prado from 1885 and in Madrid lived at 97 Bravo Murillo Street above their store. It was there that she became intrigued with her father's work and so desired following him in that career path; those around her noted her as being determined to succeed in this goal. Her initial education was at the San Fernando school before going to high school at the Cardinal Cisneros Institute prior to her college studies from 1900 to 1905. In 1887 she received her Confirmation.

Moragas became an excellent student in school and achieved top results while passing her baccalaureate on 29 June 1889. In 1900 she became one of the first women to have entered the pharmaceutical department of the college in Madrid. Moragas obtained her pharmacist's license on 16 June 1905. The death of her father in 1909 saw her assume control of his business so as to support her mother and siblings; her mother died later in 1911. In 1915 her brother Ricardo graduated as a pharmacist and he took over the business so that his sister could follow her call into the religious life. Her spiritual director around this time was José María Rubio Peralta.

On 21 June 1915 she was accepted as a postulant at the Saints Anne and Joseph convent in Madrid. On 21 December 1915 she was vested in the habit and received her religious name. She made her first vows on 24 December 1916, while her solemn profession of her vows was celebrated on 6 January 1920. On 18 April 1927 she was elected as her house's prioress and she held that position until 1930 when she served as mistress of novices until 1936. Moragas was again invested with the position of prioress on 1 July 1936 and would hold the position until her death.

On 20 July 1936 a large mob attacked the convent so she spirited her fellow religious to safe haven while seeking shelter with Sister Teresa María in the home of the latter's parents. It was around this point that her brother asked her to come live with him in a neighbouring village for her to remain safe. But she refused the offer and said that she had to watch over her sisters. But she and her companion were arrested on 14 August. During interrogations she remained silent as her questioners asked where the convent's valuables were being hidden since raids revealed nothing of value. Instead her silence caused great anger to her interrogators who pressed her for information. Her refusal prompted a militiaman to give her a piece of paper in which she wrote: "¡Viva Cristo Rey!" (Long live Christ the King). This infuriated the militiamen who decided to kill her if no information could be obtained from her. Moragas was shot dead at the San Isidro hermitage after being transported there during the late evening on 15 August before midnight.

Beatification
The beatification process was closed in the archdiocesan cathedral on 15 February 1965; the Congregation for the Causes of Saints later validated the process on 14 December 1984. The congregation likewise approved the cause on 21 January 1997. Pope John Paul II confirmed the beatification of María Sagrario de San Luis Gonzaga on 8 March 1997 after confirming that she had died in odium fidei ("in hatred of the faith"). The pope presided over the beatification rites in Saint Peter's Square on 10 May 1998. The current postulator for this cause is the Discalced Carmelite Romano Gambalunga.

Patronage
In 1998 the Archbishop of Madrid Cardinal Antonio María Rouco Varela proposed her as a patron for pharmacists on the occasion of her beatification.

References

External links
 Hagiography Circle
 Saints SQPN

1881 births
1936 deaths
Martyrs of the Spanish Civil War
20th-century Spanish nuns
20th-century venerated Christians
Beatifications by Pope John Paul II
Complutense University of Madrid alumni
Deaths by firearm in Spain
Discalced Carmelite nuns
People from Toledo, Spain
Spanish beatified people
Spanish pharmacists
Venerated Carmelites
Women pharmacists
Women in the Spanish Civil War